Best of... is the title of a compilation of the finest tracks by the Christian singing trio Nutshell. The tracks encompass all four of the group's albums, In Your Eyes (1976), Flyaway (1977), Begin Again (1978) and Believe It or Not (1979).

Track listing

Side one
 "Walking into the Wind" (Paul Field}
 "Flyaway" (Paul Field}
 "Most Unusual Love" (Paul Field}
 "Sara" (Paul Field}
 "Redeemed" (Paul Field}
 "Bedsitter / Sometimes" (Paul Field}

Side two
 "Better Take Another Look" (Paul Field/Mo McCafferty)
 "Don't Let Me Fall" (Paul Field}
 "Thief in the Night" (Paul Field}
 "Empty Page" (Paul Field}
 "Looking for Love" (Paul Field}
 "Love With no Limit" (Paul Field}
 "Heaven in Your Heart" (Paul Field}
 "Stay Close" (Paul Field}

Personnel
Paul Field: Vocals, Guitar and Piano
Annie McCaig: Vocals
Mo McCafferty: Vocals
Pam Thiele: Vocals
Heather Barlowe: Vocals
Mike Giles: Drums
John Gustafson: Bass
Kevin Peek: Guitar
Dave Martin: Guitar
Rod Edwards: Piano and Keyboards
Morris Pert: Percussion
Chris Mercer: Saxophone
Gordon Giltrap: Guitar
Rod Edwards: Piano and Keyboards
John G Perry:Bass
Mo Witham: Guitar
Andrew Lane: Flute
Frances Kelly: Harp
Gordon Miller: Drums and Synthesizer
Lionel Browne: Bass

Production notes
Engineered by Roger Wake, Dave Harris, Mike Bobak and Dick Hobbs
Recorded at Redan Recorders, Queensway, London, Sound Associates Studios, London, Morgan Studios, London and Grosvenor Studios, Birmingham

1981 greatest hits albums
Nutshell (band) albums